Isanbart (died after 806), Count in Thurgau, also known as Isambard the Saxon was an 8th-century count (comes) in the Frankish lands of Saxony and Master of the Palace at Altdorf in Alamannia.

Life
He was born about 750 AD in Narbonne, France the son of Warin I, documented as count in Thurgau, and his wife Adalindis, a daughter of Duke Hildeprand of Spoleto.

Isanbart himself was first mentioned as a Thurgau count in 774 and made significant donations to the Abbey of Saint Gall. He was Greve, Comte, of Altorf and Master of the Palace.

His wife was Thiedrada (Thietrate), of Carolingian origin, and he was the father of 
 Hedwig (Heilwig; d. after 833), married Count Welf; 
 Adalung, abbot of Lorsch 804–837;
 Adalindis
With a second wife he had Hunfrid I of Istria, Guelph of Andechs and the Brother of Bouchard "the Constable", and Alberic I de Narbonne.

He died after 806 AD in Saxony.

References 

Elder House of Welf
750s births

9th-century deaths
Year of birth uncertain
Year of death unknown
8th-century Frankish nobility